Richard Huna (born 9 March 1985) is a Slovak professional ice hockey player who currently playing for HK Levice of the Slovak 1. Liga.

He previously played for HC Slovan Bratislava, MsHK Žilina and HC Košice. He also played for Yertis Pavlodar of the Kazakhstan Hockey Championship. He is the twin brother of Robert Huna and the two have often been teammates together. His older brother Rudolf Huna is also an ice hockey player.

Career statistics

Regular season and playoffs

References

External links

1985 births
Living people
HC Košice players
MHk 32 Liptovský Mikuláš players
Sportspeople from Liptovský Mikuláš
HC Slovan Bratislava players
Slovak ice hockey forwards
Yertis Pavlodar players
MsHK Žilina players
HK Poprad players
HK Levice players
Twin sportspeople
Slovak twins
Slovak expatriate ice hockey players in the United States
Slovak expatriate sportspeople in Kazakhstan
Expatriate ice hockey players in Kazakhstan